In the sport of cricket, a hat-trick is an occasion where a bowler takes three wickets in consecutive deliveries, dismissing three different batsmen. As of June 2021, this feat has only been achieved 46 times in more than two thousand Test matches, the form of the sport in which national representative teams compete in matches of up to five days' duration. The first Test hat-trick was recorded on 2 January 1879, in only the third Test match to take place, by the Australian pace bowler Fred Spofforth, nicknamed "The Demon Bowler", who dismissed three English batsmen with consecutive deliveries at the Melbourne Cricket Ground. The most recent hat-trick was taken by South Africa's spin bowler Keshav Maharaj against the West Indies in June 2021 at Daren Sammy Cricket Ground in Gros Islet, Saint Lucia.

A player has taken two hat-tricks in the same Test match only once. Playing for Australia against South Africa in the first match of the 1912 Triangular Tournament at Old Trafford, Manchester, England, leg spinner Jimmy Matthews took a hat-trick in South Africa's first and second innings, both taken on 28 May 1912. He completed both hat-tricks by dismissing South Africa's Tommy Ward. Only three other cricketers have taken more than one Test hat-trick: Australian off spinner Hugh Trumble (two years apart, between the same teams at the same ground), Pakistani fast bowler Wasim Akram (just over a week apart, in consecutive matches between the same teams) and English fast bowler Stuart Broad. Three players have taken a hat-trick on their Test debut: English medium pace bowler Maurice Allom in 1930, New Zealand off-spinner Peter Petherick in 1976, and Australian pace bowler Damien Fleming in 1994. Alok Kapali took the fewest total Test wickets of any player who recorded a hat-trick, taking only six wickets in his entire Test career. Australian Peter Siddle is the only bowler to take a hat-trick on his birthday, and Bangladeshi off spinner Sohag Gazi is the only player to score a century and take a hat-trick in the same Test match.

Indian pacer Irfan Pathan is the only bowler to take a hat-trick in the first over of a Test match, against Pakistan in 2006.

Australian Merv Hughes is the only bowler to take a hat-trick where the wickets fell over three overs. He took a wicket (Curtly Ambrose) with the final ball of an over.  With the first ball of his next over he took the final wicket of the West Indies innings (Patrick Patterson). He then removed the opener Gordon Greenidge with the first ball of the West Indies second innings. Even more unusually, Hughes's two first-innings wickets were not consecutive, since Tim May had bowled an over himself in between Hughes's two deliveries, and took the wicket of Gus Logie.

Two other hat-tricks have taken place over two innings rather than one, both taken by West Indians against Australia—Courtney Walsh and Jermaine Lawson. Walsh's was unusual since, like Hughes's (which was in the very next Test in the series), other wickets fell between the beginning and end of the hat-trick. After dismissing Dodemaide to finish off Australia's first innings, Walsh did not open the bowling in the Australian second innings, and in fact did not bowl until Australia had already lost two wickets and were 65 for 2: then with his first two deliveries he dismissed Wood and Veletta. Lawson, meanwhile, removed tail-enders Lee and MacGill in successive deliveries before Australia declared their first innings (at 605–9), and then took the wicket of Langer with the first delivery of Australia's second innings.
  
In the five-match series between a Rest of the World XI and England in 1970, a hat-trick was taken by South African Eddie Barlow in the fourth match, at Headingley (the last three of four wickets in five balls). These matches were considered to be Tests at the time, but that status was later removed.

Test hat-tricks

By team
England and Australia combined have taken over half of all Test match hat-tricks to date, 24 of 45 (53.33%).

By player
{| class="wikitable plainrowheaders"
|+Players with multiple hat-tricks
! Player !! Hat-tricks
|- style="text-align:left;"
|-
!scope=row|
| rowspan="4" style="text-align:center" |2
|-
!scope=row|
|-
!scope=row|
|-
!scope=row|
|-

By ground

See also
 List of One Day International cricket hat-tricks
 List of Twenty20 International cricket hat-tricks

References

Cricket-related lists
 
Hat-tricks
Test cricket